Microtis graniticola, commonly known as the granite mignonette orchid or granite onion orchid is a species of orchid endemic to the south-west of Western Australia. It has a single thin, hollow, onion-like leaf and up to sixty small green to greenish-yellow flowers. It grows in soil pockets on granite outcrops, especially where the soil receives run-off during rainy weather.

Description
The callus in the centre of the labellum is variable in shape, but never comma-shaped as in the otherwise similar M. eremicola. Flowering occurs from September to November.

Taxonomy and naming
Microtis graniticola was first formally described in 1996 by Robert Bates from a specimen collected on Wave Rock near Hyden and the description was published in Journal of the Adelaide Botanic Garden. The specific epithet (graniticola) is Latin for "granite dweller", referring to the habitat preference of this species.

Distribution and habitat
Microtis graniticola grows in shallow soil pockets on large granite outcrops in arid areas between Balladonia and Mullewa. Its distribution includes parts of the Avon Wheatbelt, Coolgardie, Geraldton Sandplains, Mallee, Murchison and Yalgoo  biogeographic regions.

Conservation
Microtis eremaea is classified as "not threatened" by the Western Australian Government Department of Parks and Wildlife.

References

External links
 

graniticola
Endemic orchids of Australia
Orchids of Western Australia
Plants described in 1996